Bosconia is a town and municipality in the Colombian Department of Cesar.

Geography

The municipality of Bosconia is located in the northwestern part of the Cesar Department. Borders to the north with the municipality of El Copey, to the east with the municipality of Valledupar, to the south with the municipality of El Paso and to the west with the Magdalena Department separated only by the Ariguaní River which is also a natural border and covering a total area of 609 km2. The town of Bosconia is located in the central part of the municipality.

Climate

Average year temperature ranges 31 °C and has two rainy seasons intercalated with two dry seasons.

History

The town of Bosconia was founded on August 20, 1958, by Enrique Arón Ayén and Agustin Mackenzie in honor of Catholic church priest Saint John Bosco. The village became a train station stop for the farmers in the area. In 1979 Bosconia formally becomes a municipality of the Cesar Department. with the construction of paved highways the town of Bosconia became an intersection of two major transited Colombian highways that connect the northern Colombian departments of La Guajira and Cesar with the rest of Colombia and the other one that connects the northeast and the rest of Colombia with the road to the Caribbean sea to Santa Marta and Barranquilla. These two highways intersect in downtown Bosconia and is nowadays known as "Bosconia's T".

Politics

Administrative divisions

The municipality of Bosconia contains the urban area of the town of Bosconia and other small urban centers

Corregimientos

 Loma Colorada

Veredas

 El Edén
 La Fortuna
 Loma Linda
 Puerto Lajas
 Altos de Minas
 Boca de Tigre
 Tropezón
 Nueva Idea
 El Prado

References

External links
 Bosconia official website

 
Municipalities of Cesar Department
Populated places established in 1958
1958 establishments in Colombia